Serendipity is a blog and web-based content management system written in PHP and available under a BSD license. It supports PostgreSQL, MySQL, SQLite database backends, the Smarty template engine, and a plugin architecture for user contributed modifications.

Serendipity is available through a number of "one-click install" services such as Installatron.

Features 

Serendipity's plugin architecture allows users to modify both the appearance of the blog and its features.

Serendipity's SPARTACUS plugin automatically checks the central repository for plugins/templates upgrades and new functionality whenever a user checks the list. Users can install more than 120 plugins.

 WYSIWYG and HTML editing
 Built-in media database, can add media from URL or local file
 Multiple authors, configurable permission/usergroup system
 Threaded comments, nested categories, post to multiple categories
 Multiple languages (internationalization)
 Online plugin and template repository for easy plug-and-play installation
 Drag-and-drop sidebar plugins organization
 Category-based sub-blogs
 Static Pages
 Podcasting
 RSS planet/aggregator
 Spam blocking
 Tag support
 One-click upgrading from any version
 Can be embedded into your existing web pages
 Standards-compliant templating through Smarty
 Remote blogging via XML-RPC
 BSD-style licensing
 Multiple Database support (SQLite, PostgreSQL, MySQL, MySQLi)
 Shared installations can power multiple blogs from just one codebase
 Native import from earlier blog applications (WordPress, Textpattern, Moveable Type, bblog, etc.)
 Search engine-friendly permalink structure
 TrackBack and Pingback
 default template for frontend and backend have responsive web design

History 
The Serendipity project was started by Jannis Hermanns in the winter of 2002, then still called jBlog. Due to a naming conflict with an existing blog publishing system, Sterling Hughes suggested the name serendipity. This suggestion is based on an Essay by Sam Ruby. The short form s9y stems from abbreviations such as i18n for internationalization where the number represents the amount of omitted letters. Today the project is maintained by Garvin Hicking.

Book 

The first book about Serendipity was published in German by OpenSourcePress: Serendipity - Individuelle Weblogs für Einsteiger und Profis.
  The publisher donated the book's copyright to the Serendipity project, who has released it under a CC-BY-NC-SA license and made a GitHub repository available online.

See also 

 Comparison of content management systems

References

Content management systems
Free software programmed in PHP
Blog software
Software using the BSD license